Autocine mon amour is a 1972 Argentine comedy film directed by Fernando Siro and written by Ángel Cortese and Carlos Alberto Cresté.

Cast
 Luis Brandoni
 Marta Bianchi
 Ulises Dumont
 Ricardo Bauleo
 Gilda Lousek
 Maurice Jouvet
 Vicente Rubino
 Fernando Siro
 Nelly Beltrán
 Cristina del Valle
 Claudio Levrino
 Oscar Viale
 Ovidio Fuentes
 Edgardo Cané
 Hugo Caprera

Release and acclaim
The film premiered on 5 October 1972.

External links
 

1972 films
1970s Spanish-language films
1972 comedy films
Argentine comedy films
1970s Argentine films